The Union of Young Fascists – Vanguard (Soyuz Yunykh Fashistok — Avangard) was the young women's youth organization of the Russian Fascist Party. It was founded in 1934 in Harbin, and was open to Russian girls aged 10 to 16 years.

The main objective of the Union was "the preparation of national-minded Russian young women and girls to responsible national service based on religion, nationalism, and work".

The uniform consisted of a white blouse with a black tie and a black skirt.

In common with the boys section 
The ideology and tactics of the Union were entirely determined by members of the Russian Fascist Party. Membership was obtained on recommendation of an existing member of the Vanguard or a member of the senior Russian Fascist Party.

The Union was divided into two groups, Junior (10 to 13 years) and Senior (13 to 16 years). Each group was divided into two categories: Second Level (Young Fascists) and First Level (Avangardistki).

Commanding officers in the Union were the Senior Source, the Senior District Commander, and Senior Divisional Commander.

The lowest structural unit in the Union was the "Focus", a group of five people. Several of these that were geographically close to each other formed a District, and together with other suburban areas or units otherwise related, they formed a Department. The head of the group was appointed by the head of the Russian Fascist Party, the others were appointed by their respective commanders.

Notes

References 
 Stephan, John J. The Russian Fascists: Tragedy and Farce in Exile, 1925-1945. 
 К. В. Родзаевский. Завещание Русского фашиста. М., ФЭРИ-В, 2001

External links
Russian Fascist Party 

1934 establishments in the Japanese colonial empire
Anti-communist organizations
Fascism in Manchukuo
Politics of the Soviet Union
Russian Fascist Party
Russian nationalist organizations
Women's wings of political parties
Youth wings of political parties in Russia
Youth organizations established in 1934
Youth wings of fascist parties